Vincent T. Bugliosi Jr. (August 18, 1934 – June 6, 2015) was an American prosecutor and author who served as Deputy District Attorney for the Los Angeles County District Attorney's Office between 1964 and 1972. 

He became best known for successfully prosecuting Charles Manson and other defendants accused of the Tate–LaBianca murders that took place between August 9 and August 10, 1969.

In 1972, Bugliosi left the District Attorney's (DA) office and started a private practice, which included defense cases for criminal trials. He twice ran for the DA's office, but was not elected. He also began his writing career, exploring notable criminal cases.

Early life
Bugliosi was born on August 18, 1934, in Hibbing, Minnesota to parents of Italian descent. When he was in high school, his family moved to Los Angeles, California. Bugliosi graduated from Hollywood High School. He attended the University of Miami on a tennis scholarship and graduated in 1956. In 1964, he earned his law degree from the UCLA School of Law, where he was president of his graduating class.

Marriage and family
Bugliosi was married, and he and his wife Gail had two children: a daughter, Wendy, and a son, Vince Jr. Although raised as Roman Catholic, Bugliosi said later in life that he was an agnostic, although open to the ideas of deism.

Career
Bugliosi began his law career in the Los Angeles County District Attorney's office in 1964, where he served as a deputy district attorney for eight years, through 1972. He successfully prosecuted 105 out of 106 felony jury trials, which included 21 murder convictions.

Manson prosecution
As a Los Angeles County Deputy District Attorney, Bugliosi came to national attention for prosecuting the seven murders that took place August 9–10, 1969, in which Sharon Tate, Jay Sebring, Abigail Folger, Wojciech Frykowski, Steven Parent, and Leno and Rosemary LaBianca were killed.

Bugliosi successfully prosecuted Charles Manson, Charles "Tex" Watson, Susan Atkins, Patricia Krenwinkel, and Leslie Van Houten for these murders, and each was convicted. He was credited especially with gaining conviction of Manson, who had not been physically involved in the murders.

Political candidate
In 1972, Bugliosi ran as a Democrat for Los Angeles County District Attorney against longtime incumbent Joseph Busch. Joseph Gellman was his legal counsel for this campaign. Bugliosi narrowly lost the campaign. Bugliosi ran again in 1976, after Busch died of a heart attack in 1975, but lost to interim District Attorney John Van de Kamp, who was incumbent.

Private practice

After leaving the Los Angeles district attorney's office in 1972, Bugliosi turned to private practice. He represented three criminal defendants, achieving acquittals for each of them—the most famous of which was Stephanie Stearns (referred to as "Jennifer Jenkins" in his book), whom he defended for the murder of Eleanor "Muff" Graham on Palmyra Atoll, a South Pacific island.

Writing career

After leaving the DA's office, Bugliosi wrote, jointly with Curt Gentry, a book about the Manson trial called Helter Skelter (1974). The book won an Edgar Award from the Mystery Writers of America for the best true crime book of the year.

It was adapted twice for television movies (one produced in 1976 and one in 2004). As of 2015, it is the best-selling true crime book in publishing history, with more than 7 million copies sold.

He has written several other books, mostly dealing with well-known crimes. His works include And the Sea Will Tell (1991), which he wrote with Bruce Henderson about the murder case against Stephanie Stearns. It was a #1 New York Times bestselling book. He later wrote Reclaiming History: The Assassination of President John F. Kennedy (2007), in which he challenged numerous conspiracy theories and explored the events surrounding the assassination. He also wrote The Prosecution of George W. Bush for Murder (2008), a condemnation of former president George W. Bush's decision to invade Iraq.

O. J. Simpson case

Bugliosi wrote Outrage: The Five Reasons Why O. J. Simpson Got Away with Murder (1996), about the acquittal of O. J. Simpson for the murders of Nicole Brown Simpson and Ronald Lyle Goldman. Bugliosi argues that Simpson was guilty. He criticizes the work of the district attorney, prosecutors, defense lawyers, and Judge Lance Ito. He criticized the media for characterizing Simpson's lawyers as "the Dream Team," and said that the lawyers were unremarkable and of average ability. He used his profiles to explore what he considers broader problems in American criminal justice, the media, and the political appointment of judges.

Bill Clinton
Bugliosi criticized the U.S. Supreme Court's decision in Clinton v. Jones. In his book, No Island of Sanity, he argues that the right of a president to be free of a private lawsuit while in office outweighed Paula Jones's interest in having her case brought to trial immediately.

George W. Bush

Bugliosi condemned the U.S. Supreme Court's decision in the Bush v. Gore case that decided the 2000 presidential election. He wrote a lengthy criticism of the case for The Nation, titled "None Dare Call It Treason," which he later expanded into a book titled The Betrayal of America. Some of his criticisms were depicted in the 2004 documentary Orwell Rolls in His Grave.

He also believed that George W. Bush should have been charged with the murders of the thousands of American soldiers who died in  the Invasion of Iraq, because of his belief that Bush launched the invasion under false pretenses. In his book, The Prosecution of George W. Bush for Murder, he laid out his view of evidence and outlined what questions he would ask Bush at a potential murder trial. Bugliosi testified at a House Judiciary Committee meeting on July 25, 2008, at which he urged impeachment proceedings for Bush. The book formed the basis of a 2012 documentary film, The Prosecution of an American President.

JFK assassination
Bugliosi is on record for believing that Senator Robert F. Kennedy was the victim of a conspiracy. He said the following during a civil trial of the RFK assassination:
 
We are talking about a conspiracy to commit murder ... a conspiracy the prodigious dimensions of which would make Watergate look like a one-roach marijuana case.

As a result of his research, Bugliosi came to refute conspiracy theories.

In 1986, Bugliosi played the part of prosecutor in an unscripted 21-hour mock television trial of Lee Harvey Oswald. His legal opponent, representing Oswald, was the well-known criminal defense attorney Gerry Spence. London Weekend Television sponsored the mock trial, which followed Texas criminal trial procedure. It also included a former Texas judge and a jury of U.S. citizens from the Dallas area which reviewed hundreds of exhibits and listened to witnesses who testified about the assassination. The jury found Oswald guilty. Spence remarked, "No other lawyer in America could have done what Vince did in this case."

The program required extensive preparation by Bugliosi and inspired him to later write a comprehensive book on the subject of the assassination. His 1,612-page book (with a CD-ROM containing an additional 958 pages of endnotes and 170 pages of source notes), Reclaiming History: The Assassination of President John F. Kennedy, was published in May 2007. His book examined the JFK assassination in detail and drew on a variety of sources; his findings were in line with those of the Warren Report, which concluded that Lee Harvey Oswald acted alone in the assassination of the 35th President. He called Reclaiming History his "magnum opus." The book won the 2008 Edgar Award for Best Fact Crime. A portion of the book was re-published in 2008 as Four Days in November: The Assassination of President John F. Kennedy, which became the basis of the 2013 film  Parkland.

The title of Reclaiming History derived from Bugliosi's belief that the history of the Kennedy assassination has been hijacked by conspiracy theories, the popularity of which, he asserted, has a pernicious and ongoing effect on American thought:

Method of writing
Bugliosi did not own a computer and at one time did all his research through library microfilm archives. In his later years, he relied on his virtual secretary, Rosemary Newton, to help with these tasks. He also wrote his books entirely by hand, with Newton later transcribing his long-hand texts.

Death

Bugliosi died of cancer at age 80, at a Los Angeles hospital on June 6, 2015. He is interred in the Forest Lawn Memorial Park in Glendale, California.

Works

Books
 Helter Skelter (with Curt Gentry) (1974) (Edgar Award, 1975, Best Fact Crime book)
 Till Death Us Do Part: A True Murder Mystery (with Ken Hurwitz) (1978) (Edgar Award, 1979, Best Fact Crime book)
 Shadow of Cain (with Ken Hurwitz) (1981)
 Lullaby and Good Night (with William Stadiem) (1987)
 Cleopatra: Biography (1988)
 Dinner with the Timbo: Getting to Know a Great Man (with Timothy Bishop) (1990)
 And the Sea Will Tell (with Bruce Henderson) (1991)
 Drugs in America: The Case for Victory - A Citizen's Call to Action (1991)
 The Phoenix Solution: Getting Serious About Winning America's Drug War (1996)
 Outrage: The Five Reasons Why O. J. Simpson Got Away with Murder (1996)
 No Island of Sanity: Paula Jones v. Bill Clinton—The Supreme Court on Trial (1998)
 The Betrayal of America: How the Supreme Court Undermined the Constitution and Chose Our President (2001)
 Reclaiming History: The Assassination of President John F. Kennedy (2007) (Edgar Award, 2008, Best Fact Crime book)
 The Prosecution of George W. Bush for Murder (2008)
 Four Days in November: The Assassination of President John F. Kennedy (2008)
 Divinity of Doubt: The God Question (2011)

In film and television
Many of Bugliosi's books have been adapted to the screen, and he appeared as a character in several of them.
 Helter Skelter 1976 (portrayed by George DiCenzo)
 On Trial: Lee Harvey Oswald (1986 TV film appearing as himself)
 And the Sea Will Tell  1991 TV film (portrayed by Richard Crenna)
 Till Death Us Do Part 1992 TV film (portrayed by Arliss Howard)
 Helter Skelter 2004 (portrayed by Bruno Kirby)
He also appeared as himself in the 1973 documentary film Manson.

Articles
 "No Justice, No Peace", Playboy, February, 1993.
 "None Dare Call It Treason", The Nation, February 5, 2001.

See also
2007 in literature

References

External links 
VIDEO: Bugliosi talks with Investigation Discovery about the Manson Family murders. July 2, 2008
 Vincent Bugliosi video interview with the American Book Tour on the Kennedy Assassination
 Vincent Bugliosi Interview on Democracy Now! regarding The Prosecution of George W. Bush for Murder

In Depth interview with Bugliosi, November 4, 2007

1934 births
2015 deaths
People from Hibbing, Minnesota
American agnostics
American legal writers
American non-fiction crime writers
American political writers
American male non-fiction writers
Critics of conspiracy theories
Researchers of the assassination of John F. Kennedy
Edgar Award winners
California Democrats
Writers from California
Writers from Minnesota
District attorneys in California
History of Los Angeles
American people of Italian descent
UCLA School of Law alumni
University of Miami alumni
Manson Family
Deaths from cancer in California
Burials at Forest Lawn Memorial Park (Glendale)